This is a list of foreign players that have played in the Portuguese Primeira Liga.

Players in bold are the ones that have international caps for their senior national team.
Clubs in bold are the current clubs of those players.

Albania
Edmond Abazi – Boavista, Académica de Coimbra – 1994–1996, 1996–1999
Klevis Dalipi – Santa Clara – 1997–2000

Algeria
Hichem Belkaroui – Nacional – 2015–16
Selim Bouadla – Académica de Coimbra– 2015–16
Yacine Brahimi – Porto – 2014–2019
Abdelmalek Cherrad – Marítimo – 2009–2011
Bilel Aouacheria – Moreirense, Farense – 2017–
Karim Fellahi – Estoril – 2003–2005
Kamel Ghilas – Vitória de Guimarães – 2006–2008
Nabil Ghilas – Moreirense, Porto – 2012–2014
Rafik Halliche – Nacional – 2007–2010
Okacha Hamzaoui – Nacional – 2016–17
Florent Hanin – Belenenses – 2016–2017
Youssef Haraoui – Chaves – 1992–1993
Mehdi Kerrouche – Naval – 2009–2010
Rabah Madjer – Porto – 1985–1991
Hakim Medane – Famalicão – 1991–1994, 1995–1996, Salgueiros – 1994–1995
Djamel Menad – Famalicão – 1990–1992, Belenenses – 1992–1993
Billal Sebaihi – Estoril– 2015–2016
Islam Slimani – Sporting CP – 2013–16
El Arabi Hillel Soudani – Vitória de Guimarães – 2011–2013
Aymen Tahar– Boavista – 2015–16, 2017–19
Hassan Yebda – Benfica, Belenenses – 2008–2009, 2017–18
Kheireddine Zarabi – Belenenses - 2008-(2009), Vitória de Setúbal - 2009-2010, União Madeira – 2015–16
Nassim Zitouni – Vitória de Guimarães – 2014–16

Angola
Cláudio Abreu – Santa Clara – 1996–2002
Akwá – Benfica – 1994–1995, Alverca – 1995–1997, Académica Coimbra – 1997–1998
Aurélio – Académica – 1997–1998
Filipe Bento – Espinho – 1992–1994
Bernardo – Alverca, Nacional, Estrela da Amadora – 1999–2004
Bodunha – Salgueiros, Braga – 2000-2003
Canberra – Gil Vicente, Rio Ave, Leça, Desportivo das Aves – 1991–2001
Abel Campos – Benfica, Estrela da Amadora, Braga – 1988–1992
Carlos Fernandes – Boavista, Rio Ave, Moreirense – 2004–2005, 2009–2010, 2013–2014
Celino – Vitória de Setúbal – 2002–2003
Chaínho – Estrela da Amadora, Porto, Marítimo, Nacional – 1994–2001, 2003–2007
Chinguila – Marítimo – 1999–2002
Dédé – Paços de Ferreira – 2007–2009
Djalma – Marítimo, Porto – 2007–2015
Édson Nobre – Paços de Ferreira – 2005–2009
Fernando – Santa Clara – 1997–2003, 2004–2008
Paulo Figueiredo – Belenenses – 1992–1993, 1994–1995, Santa Clara – 1996–2004
Franklin – Belenenses – 1997–2003
Freddy – Estoril – 1998–2001, União de Leiria – 2001–2005, Desportivo das Aves – 2006–2007
Fredy – Belenenses – 2008–2010, 2013-2015, 2017-
Ganga – Braga – 1995–1997
João Ricardo – Moreirense – 2000–2005
Kadú – Porto – 2011-12
Kali – Santa Clara – 2001–2005
Genséric Kusunga – União Madeira – 2015–(2016)
Lázaro – Estoril, Penafiel, Estrela da Amadora – 1989–1994, 1995–2004
Luisinho – Braga – 1994–1996
André Macanga – Salgueiros, Alverca, Vitória de Guimarães, Académica, Boavista – 1999–2004
Mantorras – Alverca, Benfica – 1999–2011
Marco Abreu – União da Madeira, Varzim – 1998–1999, 2000–2001
Marco Airosa – Nacional – 2008–2009
Mateus – Gil Vicente, Boavista, Nacional, Arouca, Boavista – 2006-2013, 2016–
Maurito – União de Leiria – 2003–2004
Mauro – Paços de Ferreira, Belenenses - 2001-2004
Mawete Júnior – Benfica, Braga – 1999–2002
António Mendonça – Varzim, Belenenses, Estrela da Amadora – 1999-2009
Nélson – Campomaiorense – 1997–1998
Osvaldo – Naval – 2006–2007
Paulão – Vitória de Setúbal – 1994–1995, Benfica – 1995–1997, Académica Coimbra – 1997–1998
Ary Papel - Moreirense - 2017-18
Carlos Pedro – Académica, Espinho – 1992–2000
Fua Pinto – Torreense, Boavista, União de Leiria – 1991-1992, 1993–1997
Júlio Pinto – Estrela da Amadora – 1998–1999
Quinzinho – Porto, União de Leiria, Rio Ave, Farense, Desportivo das Aves, Alverca – 1995–2002
Roberto – Estoril, União de Leiria, Felgueiras – 1986–1990, 1991-1993, 1995–1996
Rui Marques – Marítimo – 2004–2005
Saavedra – Belenenses – 1988–1991, Chaves – 1991–1993
Santana – Vitória de Guimarães – 2008–2009
Show – Belenenses SAD 2019–2020, Boavista – 2020–
Sousa – Campomaiorense – 1989–2001
Álvaro Cardoso Teixeira – Vitória de Setúbal – 1982–1986, Belenenses – 1986–1995, Felgueiras – 1995–1996
Júlio Tomé – Estrela da Amadora – (1998)–1999
Vata – Varzim, Benfica, Estrela da Amadora – 1984–1992
Jorge Filipe Vidigal – Sporting CP, Beira-Mar – 2001-2002, 2006–2007
Lito Vidigal – Belenenses, Santa Clara – 1995–2003
Wilson – Gil Vicente, Belenenses – 1994–2005
Zé Kalanga – Boavista – 2007–2008

Argentina
Alberto Acosta – Sporting CP – 1998–2001
Pablo Aimar – Benfica – 2008–2013
Mauro Airez – Belenenses – 1991–1995, Benfica – 1995–1997, Estrela da Amadora – 1997–1998
César Asís – Portimonense SC – 2008–(2009)
Fernando Ávalos – Boavista – 2001–2003, Nacional – 2003–2008, Belenenses – 2008–(2009)
Hernán Barcos – Sporting CP – 2016–
Carlos Barrionuevo – Penafiel – 2005–2006
Fernando Belluschi – Porto – 2009–2012
Nelson Benítez – Porto – 2008–2009, Leixões S.C. – (2009)–2010
Gonzalo Bergessio – Benfica – 2007–2008
Maxi Bevacqua – Braga – (2005)–2006, Estrela da Amadora – 2005–(2006)
Mario Bolatti – Porto – 2007–2009
Gabriel Miguel Bordi – Braga – 2002–2003
Carlos Bossio – Benfica – 1999–2001, 2002–2004, Vitória de Setúbal – 2001–2002
Claudio Caniggia – Benfica – 1994–1995
Sebastián Cattaneo – Académica – 1998–2000
Tomás Costa – Porto – 2008–2011
Ángel Di María – Benfica – 2007–2010
Andrés Díaz – Benfica – (2007)–2008
Aldo Duscher – Sporting CP – 1998–2000
Juan Esnáider – Porto – (2001)–2002
Maxi Estévez – Estrela da Amadora – (2005)–2006
Raúl Estévez – Académica – 2006–2007
Ernesto Farías – Porto – 2007–2010
Mariano Fernández – Beira-Mar – 2002–2003
Rogelio Funes Mori – Benfica – 2013–2015
Nicolás Gaitán – Benfica – 2010–2016
Diego Galván – Beira-Mar – 2002–2003
Gonzalo Garavano – Estrela da Amadora – (2008)–2009
Ezequiel Garay – Benfica – 2011–2014
Gabriel Gervino – União de Leiria – 1992–1998
Bruno Giménez Marioni – Sporting CP – 1997–1999
Lucho González – Porto – 2005–2009, 2012–2014
Mariano González – Porto – 2007–2011
Leandro Grimi – Sporting CP – 2007–2013
Enzo Gutiérrez – Marítimo – 2008–(2009)
Gabriel Heinze – Sporting CP – 1998–1999
Mauricio Hanuch – Sporting CP – (1999)–2000, Santa Clara – 2001–2002
Hugo Ibarra – Porto – 2001–2002
Emiliano Insúa – Sporting CP – 2011–2013
Franco Jara – Benfica – (2010)–2015
Julián Kmet – Sporting CP – 1998–1999
César La Paglia – Vitória de Setúbal – (2006)–2007
Federico Lagorio – Marítimo – 2000–2001
Rodrigo Lamardo – Olhanense – 2009–2010
Pedro Maurício Levato – Beira-Mar – 2001–2005, 2008–2009
Lisandro López (born 1983) – Porto – 2005–2009
Lisandro López (born 1989) – Benfica – 2013–
Ricardo Lunari – Farense – 1999–(2000)
Andrés Madrid – Braga – 2005–2011, Porto – 2009, Nacional – 2011–2012
Julio Marchant – Nacional – 2004–2007
Lucas Mareque – Porto – 2006–(2007)
Carlos Marinelli – Braga – 2005–2006
Matías Miramontes – União de Leiria – 2005–2006
Javier Martín Musa – Marítimo – 2001–2004
Daniel Mustafa – Estrela da Amadora – 2008–2009
Federico Nieto – Estrela da Amadora – (2005)–2006
Nicolás Otamendi – Porto – 2010–2014
Franco Parodi – Rio Ave – 2009
Walter Paz – Gil Vicente – 1994–1995
Enzo Pérez – Benfica – 2011–2015
Rubén Piaggio – Marítimo – 1999–2000
Juan Martín Pietravallo –Olhanense – 2009–2010
Marcelo Pontiroli – Varzim – 2002–2003
Sebastián Prediguer – Porto – 2009–2012
Martin Prest – Marítimo – 2006–2007
Livio Prieto – Paços de Ferreira – 2008–2009
Facundo Quiroga – Sporting CP – 1998–2000, 2001–2004
Fabián Rinaudo – Sporting CP – 2011–2014
Emanuel Rivas – Vitória de Guimarães – 2005–2006
Pablo Rodríguez – Beira-Mar – (2004)–2005
Marcos Rojo – Sporting CP – 2012–2014
Leandro Romagnoli – Sporting CP – 2006–2009
Eduardo Salvio – Benfica – 2010–2011, 2012–
Franco Cervi – Benfica – 2016–
Javier Saviola – Benfica – 2009–2012
José Shaffer – Benfica (2009)–2010
Jonathan Silva – Sporting CP – 2014–
Leonardo Tambussi – Boavista – 2006–2008
Mariano Toedtli – Marítimo – 1999–2000
Cristian Trombetta – Leixões – 2009–2010
Roberto Tucker – Leixões SC – 2009–2010
Diego Valeri – Porto – 2009–2010
Valentín Viola – Sporting CP – 2012–2016

Armenia
 Gevorg Ghazaryan - Maritimo - 2015-

Australia
Nick Ansell – Tondela – 2017–2018
Vlado Bozinovski – Beira-Mar, Sporting CP, Paços de Ferreira, Felgueiras – 1989-1992, 1993–1996
Michael Curcija – Braga – 2000–2001
Jason Davidson – Paços de Ferreira – 2009–2010
Eugene Galeković – Beira-Mar – 2004–2005
Awer Mabil – Paços de Ferreira – 2017–2018
Ernie Tapai – Estoril – 1993–1994

Austria
Marc Janko – Porto – 2011-2012
Hans-Peter Berger – Leixões – 2008–2010
Markus Berger – Académica, Gil Vicente, Tondela – 2007–2011, 2014–2016
Rolf Landerl' – Penafiel – 2004–2005
Roland Linz – Boavista – 2006–2007, Braga – 2007–2009
Arnold Wetl – Porto – 1996–1997

Azerbaijan
Kamran Aghayev – Boavista – 2016–2017
Renat Dadashov – Paços de Ferreira – (2019)–2020
Vali Gasimov – Vitória de Setúbal – 1997–1999
Emin Makhmudov – Boavista – 2016–2017

Barbados
Peter Hinds - Marítimo, Gil Vicente - 1990-1993

Belarus
Renan Bressan – Rio Ave – 2014–2016
Vitali Kutuzov – Sporting CP – 2002–2003

Belgium
Patrick Asselman – Marítimo – 1996–2000
Serge Cadorin – Portimonense, Académica Coimbra – 1983–1989
Stéphane Demol – Porto, Braga - 1989–1990, 1994–1995
Guy Hubart – Boavista, Estrela da Amadora – 1986–1995
Mbo Mpenza – Sporting CP – 1999–2001
David Paas – Vitória de Guimarães – 1996–1999
Michel Preud'homme – Benfica – 1994–1999
Yves Van der Straeten – Marítimo – 1996–2000
Alain Thiriart – Portimonense, Desportivo das Aves, Beira-Mar, Tirsense, Espinho – 1984–1993
Patrick Vervoort – Vitória de Guimarães – 1996–1997
Filip De Wilde – Sporting CP – 1996–1998
Steven Defour – Porto – 2011–2014
Axel Witsel – Benfica – 2011–2012

Benin
Emmanuel Imorou – Braga – 2011–2012 
Oumar Tchomogo – Vitória de Setúbal, Vitória de Guimarães – 2005–2007

Bolivia
Ronald García – Alverca – 2001–2004
Gualberto Mojica – Paços de Ferreira – 2006–2007
Erwin Sánchez – Benfica, Estoril, Boavista – 1990–2004
Edivaldo Hermoza - Naval, Moreirense - 2008-2011, 2014-2015 
Mauricio Saucedo - Vitoria de Guimarães - 2010-11

Bosnia and Herzegovina
Nail Beširović – Estrela da Amadora – Académica, Espinho, Farense – 1991–1992, 1994–2001
Vladan Danilović – Nacional – 2020–
Emir Granov – Farense – 1998–1999
Goran Kovačević – União da Madeira – 1994–1997
Dane Kuprešanin – Famalicão, Vitória de Guimarães – 1991–1996
Nikola Milinković – Chaves, Alverca – 1996–2001
Srdjan Slagalo – Varzim – 1995–1998
Jasminko Velić – Estrela da Amadora – 1996–1998

Brazil
List of Brazilian Primeira Liga players

Brunei
Faiq Bolkiah – Marítimo – 2000–

Bulgaria
Vanio Kostov - Sporting CP, Belenenses, Farense - 1982-1988
Nikola Spasov - Farense, Salgueiros, Paços de Ferreira, S.C. Beira-Mar, Rio Ave - 1986-1993
Yulian Spasov - Paços de Ferreira - 1989–1997
Georgi Velinov - Braga - 1987–1988
Lachezar Tanev - Chaves - 1989–1990
Krasimir Bezinski - Portimonense - 1989–1991
Vasil Dragolov - Torreense - 1991–1992
Antoni Zdravkov - Marítimo - 1990–(1991), Nacional - 1991–1992
Valentin Ignatov - União Madeira - 1997–1998
Metodi Tomanov - Atlético Clube de Portugal - 1988–1990
Marin Bakalov - Chaves - 1992–1993
Blagoy Alexandrov – Chaves – 1995–1996
Krassimir Balakov – Sporting CP – 1990–1995
Krum Bibishkov – Marítimo – 2004–2005, Penafiel – 2005–2006, Académica – 2010
Georgi Chilikov – Nacional – 2005–2007
Plamen Getov – Portimonense, Chaves – 1989–1991, 1994–1996
Boncho Genchev – Sporting CP – 1991–1992
Zhivko Gospodinov – Fafe – 1988–1990
Ilian Iliev – Benfica – 1995–1997, Marítimo – 1999–2002
Emil Kostadinov – Porto – 1990–1994
Kostadin Kostadinov – Braga – 1987–1988
Todor Kutchoukov – Beira-Mar – 2006–2007
Petar Mihtarski – Porto – 1991–1992, Famalicão – 1992–1993
Borislav Mihaylov – Belenenses – 1989–1991
Stoycho Mladenov – Belenenses – 1986–1989, Vitória de Setúbal – 1989–1991, Estoril – 1991–1993
Kiril Nikolov – Braga – 2003–(2004)
Dian Petkov – Belenenses – (1997)–1998
Petar Petrov – Beira-Mar – 1989–1993
Ayan Sadakov – Belenenses – 1989–1991
Simeon Slavchev – Sporting CP – 2014–15
Georgi Slavkov – Chaves – 1987–1992
Nikolai Stanchev – Chaves – 1998–1999
Stanimir Stoilov – Campomaiorense – 1995–1997
Plamen Timnev – Chaves – (1998)–1999
Iliya Voynov – Portimonense – 1989–1991, Estoril – 1991–1995, Estrela da Amadora – 1995–1996
Ivaylo Yordanov – Sporting CP – 1991–2001
Radoslav Zdravkov – Chaves – 1986–1989, Braga – 1989–1990
Todor Kyuchukov - Beira-Mar - 2006-2007
Valeri Bojinov - Sporting CP - 2011-2012

Burkina Faso
Issouf Ouattara – União de Leiria, Trofense - 2008–2011
Saïdou Panandétiguiri – União de Leiria – 2009–2011
Stéphane – Olhanense, Arouca – 2009–2010, 2013-2014
Mamadou Tall – União de Leiria – 2008–2011
Narcisse Yameogo – Braga – 2003–2004
Ousseni Zongo – União de Leiria – 2007–2009

Cameroon
Vincent Aboubakar – Porto – 2014–
Georges Nnomo Ambassa – Boavista – (2004)–2005
Clément Beaud – Académica – 2004–2005
André Bikey – Paços de Ferreira – 2002–(2003), Desportivo das Aves – (2003)–2004
Michel Pensée Billong – Desportivo das Aves – 2000–2001
Gilles Binya – Benfica – 2007–2009
Yohanna Buba – Estoril – 2003–2006, Beira-Mar – 2005–2008
Roudolphe Douala – Boavista – 1998–2000, Desportivo das Aves – 2000–2001, Gil Vicente – 2001–2002, União de Leiria – 2002–2004, Sporting CP – 2004–2007
Ernest Ebongué – Vitória de Guimarães – 1988–1989
David Embé – Belenenses – 1993–1994
Guy Essame – Boavista – 2005–2008
Fabrice Fokobo – Sporting CP – 2013– , Arouca – 2015–2016
Émile Mbamba – Vitória de Setúbal – 2006–2007
Émile Mbouh – Vitória de Guimarães – 1990–1991
Georges Messi – Olhanense – 2006–2009
Albert Meyong – Vitória de Setúbal – 2000–2005, Belenenses – 2005–2006, 2007–(2008), Braga – 2008–2012, Vitória de Setúbal – 2012–2013
Jean-Jacques Missé-Missé – Sporting CP – 1996–1997
Jacques Momha – Vitória de Guimarães – 2006–2009
Serge N'Gal – União de Leiria – 2006–2008
Alain N'Kong – Paços de Ferreira – 2003, Nacional – 2004
Patrick – Farense – 2001–2003
William Paul – Desportivo das Aves – 2005–2007
Christian Pouga – Leixões – 2009–2010, Marítimo – 2011–2012, Boavista – 2014–2016
William Andem – Boavista – 1997–2007
Jean Paul Yontcha – Belenenses – 2009–2010, Olhanense – 2010–2013
Herve Xavier Zengue – Leixões – 2006–2007

Canada
Fernando Aguiar – Marítimo, Nacional, Beira-Mar, União de Leiria, Benfica, Penafiel – 1994-1997, 1999-2001, 2002–2005
Alex Bunbury – Marítimo – 1993–1999
Pedro Pacheco – Nacional – 2009–2010
Steven Vitória – Benfica, Moreirense – 2013–2016, 2019-

Cape Verde
Baroti – Estrela da Amadora – 1989–1993
Nuno Borges – Nacional – 2020–
Brito – Gil Vicente, Boavista, Marítimo – 2012–2015, 2016-2017
Caló – Salgueiros – 2000–2002
Dady – Belenenses, Olhanense – 2005–2007, 2010-2012
Danielson – União de Leiria – 2007–2009
Dário Furtado – Gil Vicente – 2000–2001, 2002–2003
Duka – Espinho – 1994–2000, Campomaiorense – 2000–2002
Emerson Gabei – Estrela da Amadora – 2005–2006, Beira-Mar – 2006–2009
Ernesto – Alverca – 2000–2005
Gerson – Belenenses – 1997–1999, 2000–2004
Héldon – Marítimo, Sporting CP, Rio Ave, Vitória de Guimarães – 2010–
Janício – Vitória de Setúbal – 2005–2009
Kiki – Vitória de Guimarães – 1982–1984, Braga – 1987–1989, 1992–1993, Porto – 1989–1992, Paços de Ferreira – 1993–1994
Kisley – União Madeira – 2015–2016
Lito – Moreirense – 2003–2005, Naval – 2005–2007, Académica Coimbra – 2007–2010, Portimonense – 2010–11
Lixa – Vitória de Guimarães – 1999–2003
Mateus – Beira-Mar – 2007–2008, Rio Ave – 2008–2009
Mirandinha – Vitória de Guimarães – 1998–2000
Vítor Moreno – Estoril – 2005, Vitória de Guimarães – 2005–2007, Estrela da Amadora – 2007–2009, União de Leiria – 2009–2010
Nilson – União Madeira – 2015–2016
Nilton – Boavista – 1999–2000, Gil Vicente – 2001–2002, Penafiel – 2004–2006
Nilton – Salgueiros – 1995–1997
Vargas Fernandes – Gil Vicente – 2000–2001
Pecks – Gil Vicente – 2012–
Pelé – Farense – 2002–2003, Belenenses – 2003–2006
Piguita – Famalicão – 1993–1994, Beira-Mar – 1994–1995
Pina – Vitória de Setúbal – 2001–2002
Pinha – União de Leiria – (1996)–1997, 1998–1999
Ricardo – Beira-Mar – 2004–2008, Paços de Ferreira – 2008–2010, 2012–, Vitória de Guimarães – 2010–11
Nuno Rocha – C.S. Marítimo – 2013–2014
Rui César – Marítimo – 1999–2001
Sandro Mendes – Vitória de Setúbal – 1994–1995, 2000–2005, 2006–2010
José Semedo – Rio Ave – 2008–2009
Sidnei – Marítimo – 2006–2009
Marco Soares – União de Leiria – 2007, 2009–2012
Tchide – Gil Vicente – 2000–2001
Toni – Rio Ave – 1990–1992, 1993–1994, Braga – 1992–1993, 1994–2000, Santa Clara – 2000–2002
Toy – Olhanense – 2004–2005, 2009–2012
Fernando Varela – Trofense, Feirense - 2008-2009, 2011–2012
José Veiga – Benfica – 1995–1996
Nélson Veiga – Estoril, Vitória de Setúbal, Naval – 1996–2006
Artur Jorge Vicente – Espinho, Salgueiros, Boavista, União de Leiria, Rio Ave, Farense – 1996–2001
Vinha – Salgueiros, Porto – 1990–1998
Zé Rui – Belenenses, Vitória de Setúbal – 1993-2000 
Zezinho – União de Leiria – 1997–2003

Chile
Mario Cáceres – Sporting CP – 2000–2001
Pablo Contreras – Sporting CP – 2002–2003, Braga – 2007–(2008)
Alejandro Escalona – Benfica – 2000–2001
Matías Fernández – Sporting CP – 2009–2012
Felipe Flores Quijada – Boavista – 2004–2005
David Henríquez – Beira-Mar – 2002–2003
Braulio Leal – Vitória de Guimarães – 2004–2005
Igor Lichnovsky – Porto – 2015–
Alejandro Osorio – Beira-Mar – 2003–2004
Mauricio Pinilla – Sporting CP – 2004–2006
Diego Rubio – Sporting CP – 2011–2015
Alex Von Schwedler – Marítimo – 2006–2007, Belenenses – 2008–2009
Rodrigo Tello – Sporting CP – 2001–2007
Cristián Uribe – Benfica – 1999–2001, Moreirense – 2003–2004
Juan Viveros – Sporting CP – (1999)–2000, Alverca – 2000–2001, União de Leiria – 2002–2003

Colombia
Santiago Arias – Sporting CP – 2011–2013
Néstor Álvarez – Académica – 2006–2007
Brayan Angulo – Boavista – 2007–2008, Leixões – 2008–2009
Jorge Bermúdez – Benfica – 1996–1997
Cristian Borja - Sporting CP, Braga - 2016-
Guillermo Celis - Benfica, Vitória de Guimarães - 2016-2017, 2016-2020
Edwin Congo – Vitória de Guimarães – 2000–2001
Óscar Estupiñán – Vitória de Guimarães – 2017–
Radamel Falcao – Porto – 2009–2011
Fredy Guarín – Porto – 2008–2012
Teófilo Gutiérrez – Sporting CP – 2015–2017
Jackson Martínez – Porto – 2012–2015
Fredy Montero – Sporting CP – 2013–2016
James Rodríguez – Porto – 2010–2013
Phil Jackson – Paços de Ferreira – 2006–2007
Felipe Pardo – Braga – 2013–2015
Ricardo Pérez – Académica – 2003–2004
Wason Rentería – Porto – 2006–2007, Braga – 2008–2009
Héctor Quiñones – Porto – 2012–2015
Juan Quintero – Porto – 2013–2019
Renny Vega – União Madeira – 2015–2016
Alexander Viveros – Boavista – 2002–2004

Congo
Moké Kajima - Braga – 1995–1996

DR Congo
Eshele Botende - Marítimo - 1996–1997
Kabwe Kasongo – Vitória de Guimarães – 1997–1999, Chaves – 1999–2008
Makalamba Katanga – Vitória de Guimarães – 1996–1997
Yves Kibuey – Académica – 2001–2002, União de Leiria – 2002–2003
Christian Kinkela - Moreirense - 2012–13
Basaula Lemba – Vitória de Guimarães – 1986–1987, 1990–1994, O Elvas – 1987–1988, Belenenses – 1994–1996
Kuyangana Makukula – Leixões – 1988–1989, Vitória de Setúbal – 1989–1992, Chaves – 1992–1993
Mangonga – Gil Vicente – 1989–1995, Tirsense – 1995–1996
Richard Mapuata – Belenenses – 1986–1988
Tueba Menayane – Benfica – 1986–1988, Vitória de Setúbal – 1988–1989, Tirsense – 1989–1991, Farense – 1991–1992, Gil Vicente – 1992–1993
Masena Moke – Gil Vicente – 1997–2000
Léon Mokuna - Sporting CP - 1954–1956
Amily N'Dinga – Vitória de Guimarães – 1986–1997
Monduone N'Kama – Vitória de Guimarães – 1986–1988, Estrela da Amadora – 1988–1989
Kalombo N'Kongolo – Espinho – 1987–1988, 1989–1993, Porto – 1988–1989
Etienne N'tsunda – Porto – 1994–1995, Gil Vicente – 1996–1997, Chaves – 1997–1999, Vitória de Guimarães – 1999–2001

Costa Rica
Brandon Poltronieri – Leixões – 2008–2010
Bryan Ruiz – Sporting CP – 2015–

Croatia
Andrija Balajić – Sporting CP – 1996–1997
Zoran Ban – Belenenses – 1994–1995, Boavista – 1995–1996
Stojan Belajić – União de Leiria – 1996–1997
Toni Borevković – Rio Ave – 2018–
Darko Butorović – Porto – 1996–1999, Farense – 1999–2000
Duje Čop – Nacional – 2008–2009
Goran Čumić – Tirsense – 1994–1997
Antonio Franja – Vitória de Setúbal – 2005–2006
Tomislav Ivković – Sporting CP – 1989–1993, Estoril – (1993)–1994, Vitória de Setúbal – 1993–(1994), Belenenses – 1994–1996, Estrela da Amadora – 1997–1998
Nikola Jambor – Rio Ave – 2018–
Mladen Karoglan – Chaves – 1991–1993, Braga – 1993–1999
Siniša Končalović – Estrela da Amadora – 1994–1995
Filip Krovinović – Rio Ave – 2015–2017
Petar Krpan – Sporting CP – 1998–1999, União de Leiria – 1999–2001, 2004–2005
Marin Lalić – Salgueiros – 1992–1995
Silvio Marić – Porto – 2000–2001
Ivica Matić – Chaves – 1997–2000
Vatroslav Mihačić – Gil Vicente – 1995–1999
Mato Miloš – Benfica – 2017–2018, Aves – 2018–2020
Branko Miljuš – Vitória de Setúbal – 1990–1992
Mirsad Omerhodžić – Chaves – 1992–1993
Kristijan Pavlović – Nacional – 2008–2010
Alen Petrović – Belenenses – 1994–1995
Danijel Pranjić – Sporting CP – 2012–2013
Ivan Pudar – Boavista – 1991–1993
Denis Putnik – Chaves – 1996–1998
Rudi – Chaves – 1989–1992, Paços de Ferreira – 1992–1994
Mario Stanić – Benfica – 1994–1995
Tomo Šokota – Benfica – 2001–2005, Porto – 2005–2007
Robert Špehar – Sporting CP – 1999–2001
Tomislav Štrkalj – Tondela – 2019–
Mario Vojković – Chaves – 1996–1998
Josip Vuković – Marítimo – 2018–2020
Miroslav Žitnjak – União de Leiria – 1995–2000

Curaçao
Kenji Gorré – Nacional – (2018)–2019, 2020–

Cyprus
Andreas Karo – Marítimo – 2020–

Czech Republic
Pavel Horváth – Sporting CP – 2000–2001
Václav Mrkvička – Braga – 2000–2001
Karel Poborský – Benfica – 1998–2000
Tomáš Skuhravý – Sporting CP – 1995–1996
Pavel Srníček – Beira-Mar – 2004–2006
Lubomír Vlk – Porto – 1990–1993 (Czechoslovakia INT)

Denmark
Michael Manniche – Benfica – 1983–1987
Jan Sørensen – Portimonense – 1987–1989
Peter Schmeichel – Sporting CP – 1999–2001
Sebastian Svärd – Vitória de Guimarães – 2005–2006
Sammy Youssouf – Marítimo – (2005)–2006

Ecuador
Felipe Caicedo – Sporting CP –2009–2010
Iván Kaviedes – Porto – 2001–2002
Gonzalo Plata – Sporting CP – 2019-2021
Leonardo Campana – Famalicão – 2020–2021
Marlon de Jesús – Arouca – 2016–2017
Jackson Porozo – Boavista – 2020–2022
José Francisco Cevallos – 2019–2020
Vinicio Angulo – F.C. Paços de Ferreira – 2012–2013

Egypt
Magdi Abdelghani – Beira-Mar – 1988–1991
Abdel Sattar Sabry – Benfica – 2000–2001, Marítimo – 2002–2003, Estrela da Amadora – 2003–2004

El Salvador
 Arturo Álvarez - Paços de Ferreira 2012-2013
 Nelson Bonilla – C.D. Nacional -  2016

England
Gary Charles – Benfica – 1998–(1999)
Eric Dier – Sporting CP – 2012–2014
Brian Deane – Benfica – 1997–1999
Marcus Edwards – Vitória de Guimarães – 2019–,
Angel Gomes – Boavista F.C. – 2020–
Steve Harkness – Benfica – 1998–(1999)
Matt Jones (footballer, born 1986) – Belenenses – 2012–2017, Tondela – 2015–2016
Jacob Maddox – Vitória de Guimarães – 2020–,
Raphael Meade – Sporting CP 1985–1988
Scott Minto – Benfica – 1997–1999
Phil Murphy – Nacional – 1982–1984, 1985–1986, 1987–1990
Paul Murray – Beira-Mar – 2004–2006
John Richards – Marítimo – 1983–1985
Tony Sealy – Sporting CP – 1987–1988, Braga – (1988)–1989
Easah Suliman – Vitória de Guimarães – 2020–
Michael Thomas – Benfica – 1998–2000
Phil Walker – Boavista – 1984–1991

Equatorial Guinea
Javier Balboa – Benfica, Beira-Mar, Estoril – 2008–2009, 2011–2015
André Neles – Marítimo – 2003-2004

Estonia
Vjatšeslav Zahovaiko – União de Leiria – 2009–2011

Finland
Kimmo Tarkkio – Chaves – 1992–1993

France
Hassan Ahamada – Beira-Mar – 2004–(2005), Belenenses – 2005–2006
Sékou Baradji – Naval – 2008–2010
Kelly Berville – Penafiel – 2005–2008, Paços de Ferreira – 2008–2010
Guillaume Boronad – Penafiel – 2005–2006
Lionel Carole – Benfica – 2011–2013
Ghislain Chauray – Vitória de Guimarães – 2002–2003
Aly Cissokho – Vitória de Setúbal – (2008)–2009, Porto – 2008–(2009), 2015
Aurélien Collin – Vitória de Setúbal – 2009–2011
Thomas Debenest – Beira-Mar – 2002–2004
Siramana Dembélé – Vitória de Setúbal – (2005)–2006
Jean-Jacques Eydelie – Benfica – 1994–1995
Manuel dos Santos – Benfica – 2004–2006
Johann Duveau – Marítimo – 1998–2000
Vincent Dyduch – Académica – 2000–2004
Nicolas Godemèche – Naval – 2007–2011
Kévin Gomis – Naval – 2009–2011
Grégory – Gil Vicente – 2004–2006, Marítimo – 2006–2008, Vitória de Guimarães – 2008–2009
Alexandre Hauw – Naval – 2008–2011, Estoril – 2011–2012
Grégory Lacombe – Vitória de Setúbal – 2005–2006
Didier Lang – Sporting CP – 1997–1998
Eliaquim Mangala – Porto – 2011–2014
Stéphane Maurel – Estoril – 2004–2005
Cédric Moukouri – Marítimo – 2006–2008
Bourama N'Golo Ouattara – Naval – 2009–2010
Stéphane Paille – Porto – 1990–1991
Jérôme Palatsi – Beira-Mar – 1996–2001, Vitória de Guimarães – 2001–2005
Nicolas Paviot – Alverca – 2000–2004
Romuald Peiser – Naval – 2008–2010, Académica – 2010–2014
Olivier Pickeu – Varzim – 2001–2002
William Quevedo – Boavista – 1997–2002
Laurent Quievreux – União de Leiria – 2003–2006
Adil Rami – Boavista – 2020–
Laurent Robert – Benfica – 2005–(2006)
Gérard Roland – Varzim – 2001–2002
Raphael Roncen – Estoril – 2004–2005
Sylvain Sansone – Felgueiras – 1995–1996, Vitória de Setúbal – 1996–1997
Mouhamadou-Naby Sarr – Sporting CP – 2014–2015
Florent Sinama Pongolle – Sporting CP – 2010–2012
Jérémy Sopalski – Naval – 2004–2005
Aboubacar Tandia – Naval – 2009–2012
Damien Tixier – Naval – 2000–2002, Académica Coimbra – 2002–2005, União de Leiria – 2005–2007
Alioune Touré – União de Leiria – 2005–2007
Fabien Valéri – Naval – 2000–2002, Académica Coimbra – 2002–2003
Patrick Videira - Chaves
Yannick – Alverca – 2001–2004, Estoril – 2004–(2005)

Gabon
Henry Antchouet – Belenenses – 2002–2005, Vitória de Guimarães – 2005–(2006)
Etienne Bito'o – Gil Vicente – 2002–2004
Yannick Larry – Gil Vicente – 2002–2004
Théodore Nzue Nguema – Braga – 1999–2001
Parfait Ndong – Chaves – 1996–1998
Michel Souamas – União de Leiria –

Georgia
Gocha Kokoshvili – Belenenses – 1997–1998

Germany
Hans-Jörg Butt – Benfica – 2007–2008
Robert Enke – Benfica – 1999–2002
Dennis – Estrela da Amadora – 2002–2004
Maximilian Haas – União de Leiria – 2012, Braga – 2012–2013
Timo Hildebrand – Sporting CP – 2010–2011
Hany Mukhtar – Benfica – 2015–

Ghana
Joe Addo – Belenenses – 1997–1998
David Addy – Porto – 2010–2012, Académica – 2010–2011, Vitória de Guimarães – 2012–2014
Augustine Ahinful – União de Leiria – (1998)–1999,(2000)–2001, Boavista – 1999–2000
Christian Atsu – Porto – 2011–2013
Kwame Ayew – União de Leiria – 1995–1996, Vitória de Setúbal – 1996–1997, 2006–2007, Boavista – 1997–1999, Sporting CP – 1999–2000
Emmanuel Duah – União de Leiria – 1997–2002, Gil Vicente – 2002–2004
Mark Edusei – União de Leiria – 1997–1998, 1999–2000
Maxwell Konadu – União de Leiria – 1997–1999
Nii Lamptey – União de Leiria – 1998–1999
Massaudu Naddah – Desportivo das Aves – 1998–2002, Chaves – 1999–(2000)
Moses Sakyi – Estoril – 2004–2006, Estrela da Amadora – 2006–2008
William Tiero – Vitória de Guimarães – 2005–2006, Naval – 2006–2007, Académica – 2007–2010, Olhanense – 2011, Gil Vicente – 2012–2013

Greece
Panagiotis Fyssas – Benfica – 2003–2005
Georgios Karagounis – Benfica – 2005–2007
Kostas Katsouranis – Benfica – 2006–2009
Dimitris Nalitzis – Sporting CP – 2001–(2002)
Giourkas Seitaridis – Porto – 2004–2005
Vangelis Mantzios - Marítimo - 2010–2011
Christos Melissis - Marítimo – 2010
Kostas Mitroglou – Benfica – 2015–2016, 2016–
Andreas Samaris – Benfica – 2014–
Machairidis Triantafyllos – Benfica – (1999)–2000

Guadeloupe
Cédrick Fiston – Académica – 2003–2004
David Fleurival – Boavista – 2007–2008
Jean Pierre – Naval, Gil Vicente – 1998–2001
Ulick Lupède – Naval – 2009–2010

Guinea
Sambégou Bangoura – Boavista – (2007)–2008
Salim Cissé – Académica – 2012–13, 2015, Sporting CP – 2013– , Arouca – 2014, Vitória de Setúbal – 2016
Abdoul Salam Sow – Belenenses – 1997–1998

Guinea-Bissau
Adilson – Nacional – 2002–2003, 2006–2007
Alberto – Benfica, Boavista, Belenenses –
Adul Baldé – Estrela da Amadora – 2006–2008, Vitória de Setúbal – 2009
Sadjó Baldé – Nacional – 1999–2000, Gil Vicente – 2000–2001
Biri – SC Covilhã – 1987–1988
Mamadou Bobó – Porto – 1981–1984, Vitória de Guimarães – 1985–1986, Marítimo – 1986–1988, Estrela da Amadora – 1988–1990, Boavista – 1990–1997
Braíma – Gil Vicente – 2002–2006
Inzaghi Donígio – Vitória de Setúbal – 2006–2007
Dú – Santa Clara – 1987–1988, 1998–2003, Estoril – 1991–1994
Ednilson – Benfica – 2000–2003, Vitória de Guimarães – 2003–2004
Evaldo – Vitória de Guimarães – 1996–2001
Bruno Fernandes – Belenenses – 2000–2003, Desportivo das Aves – (2004)–2005, 2006–2007
Forbs – Sporting CP – 1984–1986, 1988–1989, Boavista – 1989–1990, Braga – 1990–1995
Ibraima Baldé – Estrela da Amadora – 2003–2004
Ido – União de Leiria – 1998–1999
Lino – Varzim – 1995–1998, Marítimo – 1998–2003
Lopes – Leça – 1995–1996, Espinho – 1996–(1997)
Malá – Belenenses – 1997–1998, Beira-Mar – 2003–2005
Almani Moreira – Boavista – 1999–2001, Desportivo das Aves – 2006–2007
Nando – Vitória de Setúbal – 1995–1997, 1998–1999
Petit – Salgueiros – 2001–2002
Leocísio Sami – Martítimo – 2009–2014, Porto – 2014– , Braga – 2014–15, Vitória de Guimarães – 2015
Sanã – Boavista – (2002)–2003
Serifo – Leça – 1987–2004
Toni Silva – União Madeira – 2015–(2016)
Sufrim Lopes – Naval – 2001–2008
Tavares – Boavista – 1994–1996,(1998)–1999, Penafiel – 1996–1997, 2000–2001, Gil Vicente – 1998–2001

Haiti
Yves Desmarets – Vitória de Guimarães – 2007–2010
Jean Sony – Leixões – 2009–2010, Rio Ave – 2011–2012

Honduras
Jorge Benguché – Boavista – 2020–
Alberth Elis – Boavista – 2020–
Jona – Vitória de Guimarães – 2013
Bryan Róchez – Nacional – 2017–2019, 2020–,
David Suazo – Benfica – 2008–2009

Hungary
Gergely Bobál – Nacional – 2020–
Ákos Buzsáky – Porto – 2002–2003, Académica de Coimbra – 2003–2004
Attila Dragóner – Vitória de Guimarães – 2004–2006
Miklós Fehér – Porto – 1998–2000, Salgueiros – 1999–(2000), Braga – 2000–2001, Benfica – 2002–2004
Miklós Gaál – Marítimo – (2005)–2006
Szabolcs Gyánó – Académica – 2006–2008
Ferenc Hamori – Marítimo – 1995–(1996)
Péter Lipcsei – Porto – 1995–1996, Espinho – 1996–1997
Ferenc Mészáros – Sporting CP – 1981–1983, Farense – 1983–1984, Vitória de Setúbal – 1986–1989
Lázár Szentes – Vitória de Setúbal – 1987–1988
Gábor Vayer – Santa Clara – 2001–2005
István Vincze – Campomaiorense – 1997–1999, Santa Clara – 1999–2000

Iceland
Helgi Daníelsson  - Belenenses 2013-2014
Eggert Jónsson - Belenenses 2013-2014

India
 Sanjeev Stalin - C.D. Aves 2019-(2020)

Indonesia
Greg Nwokolo – Olhanense – 2009–2010

Republic of Ireland
Pádraig Amond – Paços de Ferreira – 2010–2012
Phil Babb – Sporting CP – 2000–2002
Dominic Foley – Braga – 2003–2004
Alan Mahon – Sporting CP – (2000)–2001
Mickey Walsh – Porto – 1980–1986, Salgueiros – 1986–1987, Espinho – 1987–1988

Iran
Alireza Haghighi – Penafiel – 2014–2015, Marítimo – 2016
Amir Abedzadeh – Marítimo – 2017–2021
Mehrdad Mohammadi – Aves – 2019–2020
Mehdi Taremi – Rio Ave – 2019–2020, Porto – 2020–
Ali Alipour – Marítimo – 2020–2022, Gil Vicente – 2022–
Shahriyar Moghanlou – Santa Clara – 2020–2021
Jafar Salmani – Portimonense – 2020–2021
Mohammad Mohebi – Santa Clara – 2021–
Alireza Beiranvand – Boavista – 2021–2022
Payam Niazmand – Portimonense – 2021–

Iraq
Osama Rashid – Santa Clara – 2018–2021, Vizela – 2022–
Mohanad Ali – Portimonense – 2020
Alaa Abbas – Gil Vicente – 2020–2021

Israel
Ilan Bakhar – Braga – 2004–2005
Eli Ohana – Braga – 1990–1991
Alex Zahavi – Vitória Setúbal – 2010–11

Italy
Alberto Aquilani – Sporting CP – 2015–2016
Tommaso Berni - Braga – 2011–2012
Mirko Bigazzi – Olhanense – 2013–2014
Bryan Cristante – Benfica – 2014–15
Federico Dionisi – Olhanense – 2013–2014
Ivone De Franceschi – Sporting CP – 1999–2000
Fabrizio Miccoli – Benfica – 2005–07
Emanuele Pesaresi – Benfica – 2001–2002
Riccardo Piscitelli – Nacional – 2020–
Rodrigo Possebon – Braga – 2009–2010
Mario Sampirisi – Olhanense – 2014
Ezequiel Schelotto – Sporting CP – 2015–17

Ivory Coast
Rudolph Amessan – Académica – 2009–2013
Evariste Sob Dibo – Rio Ave – 1996–1998, Braga – 1999–2000
Gaossou Fofana – Académica – 2007–2008
Idrissa Keita – Santa Clara – 2001–2002
Seydou Koné – União de Leiria – 2009–2010
Abdul Moustapha – Trofense – 2008–2009
Ahmed Ouattara – Sporting CP – 1995–1997, Salgueiros – (2000)–2001
Dijilly Vouho – Académica – 2007–2011
Marco Zoro – Benfica – 2007–2011, Vitória de Setúbal – 2008–2010

Japan
Koki Anzai – Portimonense – 2019–2021
Mizuki Arai – Gil Vicente – 2022
Kanya Fujimoto – Gil Vicente – 2020–
Shūichi Gonda – Portimonense – 2019–2021
Nozomi Hiroyama – Braga – 2002–2003
Takahiro Kunimoto – Casa Pia – 2022–
Daizen Maeda – Marítimo – 2019–2020
Ryotaro Meshino – Rio Ave – 2020–2021, Estoril – 2021–2022
Kento Misao – Santa Clara 2023–
Hidemasa Morita – Santa Clara 2021–2022, Sporting CP 2022–
Shoya Nakajima – Portimonense – 2017–2019, 2021–2022, Porto – 2019–2022
Kosuke Nakamura – Portimonense – 2022–
Takuma Nishimura – Portimonense – 2020
Ryoya Ogawa – Vitória de Guimarães – 2022–
Theo Ryuki – Portimonense – 2017–2019
Takahito Soma – Marítimo – 2009–2010
Yuki Soma – Casa Pia – 2023–
Kyosuke Tagawa – Santa Clara 2022–
Junya Tanaka – Sporting CP – 2014–2016
Masaki Watai – Boavista – 2022–

Korea, Republic
Hwang Mun-ki – Académica de Coimbra – 2015–2016
Jung Jae-kwon – Vitória de Setúbal – 1998
Kim Byung-suk – Vitória de Setúbal – 2006–2008
Kim Dong-hyun – Braga – 2005–2007
Lee Seung-woo – Portimonense – 2021
Park Ji-soo – Portimonense – 2023– 
Suk Hyun-jun – Marítimo – 2013, Nacional – 2014–2015, Vitória de Setúbal – 2015–2016, Porto – 2016–2018

Liberia
Musa Shannon – Marítimo – 1999–2001

Liechtenstein
Peter Jehle – Boavista – 2006–2008

Lithuania
Edgaras Jankauskas – Benfica – 2001–(2002), Porto – 2002–2005, Belenenses – 2007–(2008)
Lukas Spalvis – Sporting – 2016–(2018), Belenenses –2017

Libya
Ali Elmusrati – – Vitória de Guimarães – (2019)–2020, – Rio Ave – 2019–(2020), Braga – 2020–
Djamal Mahamat – Salgueiros, Beira-Mar, Braga – 2001–2004, 2010-2013

Luxembourg
Vincent Thill – Nacional – 2020–

Macedonia

Ristovski - lenda do Sporting (recente) 
Wandeir – Naval – (2007)–2008

Madagascar
Franck Rabarivony – Vitória de Guimarães – 2001–2002

Malaysia
Nazmi Faiz – Beira-Mar – 2012–2013

Mali
Zakarias Camara – Marítimo – 1997–1999
Kalifa Cissé – Estoril, Boavista – 2003–2007
Mourtala Diakité – Beira-Mar, Boavista, Belenenses, Marítimo – 2005–2010, 2012-2013
Mamadou Djikiné – Vitória de Setúbal – 2009–2012
Habib Sissoko – União de Leiria – 1998–1999
Salif Keita - Sporting CP - 1976–1979
Falaye Sacko - Vitória de Guimarães - 2017-
Mamary Traoré – Naval – 2001–2003

Malta
Udo Nwoko – Leixões – 2007–2009

Mauritania
Souleymane Anne – Tondela – 2020–

Mauritius
Jonathan Bru – Académica – 2009–10
 Dylan Collard – Marítimo – 2023–

Mexico
Manuel Negrete Arias – Sporting CP 1986–1987
Antonio Briseño – Feirense – 2017–2019
Jesús Corona – Porto – 2015–
Ulises Dávila – Vitória de Setúbal – 2014–2016
Francisco Fonseca – Benfica – 2006–2007
Héctor Herrera – Porto – 2013–2019
Raúl Jiménez – Benfica – 2015–2019
Miguel Layún – Porto – 2015–2018
Paolo Medina – Benfica – 2017–2018
Edson Rivera – Braga – 2011–2012
Diego Reyes – Porto – 2013–2018
Raúl Gudiño – Porto – 2015–2018, União Madeira – 2015–(2016)
Joao Maleck – Porto – 2017–2018

Montenegro
Andrija Delibašić – Benfica – 2004–(2005), Braga – 2005–2006, Beira-Mar – 2006–(2007)
Milonja Đukić – Farense – 1991–1998
Zoran Filipović – Benfica – 1981–1984, Boavista – 1984–1985
Ivica Kralj – Porto – (1998)–1999
Zoran Lemajić – Farense – 1989–1992, Boavista – 1992–1993, Sporting CP – 1993–1995, Marítimo – 1995–1996
Dejan Ognjanović – Estoril – 2004–2005, 2006–2008
Sanibal Orahovac – Vitória de Guimarães – 2004–2005, Penafiel – 2005–2006
Dragoslav Poleksić – Chaves – 1996–1998, Campomaiorense – 1998–2001
Žarko Tomašević – Nacional – 2009–2012
Budimir Vujačić – Sporting CP – 1993–1997
Simon Vukčević – Sporting CP – 2007–2011, Chaves – 2016–
Željko Vuković – Chaves – 1989–1991

Morocco
Nabil Baha – Naval – 2001–2004, Braga – 2004–2005
Aziz Bouderbala – Estoril – 1992–1993
Mehdi Carcela – Benfica – 2015–16
Youssef Chippo – Porto – 1996–1999
Rachid Daoudi – Tirsense – 1995–1996, Belenenses – (1996)–1997
Aziz Doufikar – Espinho – 1987–1995, Vitória de Setúbal – 1995–1997
Mustapha El Biyaz – Penafiel – 1987–1988
Abdessamad El Bouzidi – Académica – (1998)–1999
Abdelkrim El Hadrioui – Benfica – 1996–1998
Faysal El Idrissi – Santa Clara – 1999–2000
Tahar El Khalej – União de Leiria – 1994–1997, Benfica – 1997–2000
Ali El-Omari – Gil Vicente – 2001–2003, Boavista – 2003–2004, Estoril – (2004)–2005, Beira-Mar – 2004–(2005), Marítimo – 2005–(2006)
Youssef Fertout – Belenenses – 1995–1998
Khalid Fouhami – Académica – (2003)–2004
Mustapha Hadji – Sporting CP – 1996–1997
Redouane Hajry – Benfica – 1987–1988, União da Madeira – 1989–1990, Farense – 1990–2000
Zakaria Labyad – Sporting CP – 2012–
Samir Lagnaoui – Boavista – 1995–1996
Abdel Bouyboud MlJid – Belenenses – 1994–1998
Rched Larroussi Mounir – Académica – 1996–2001
Hassan Nader – Farense – 1992–1995, 1997–2004, Benfica – 1995–1997
Youssef Nader – Farense – 1997–1998
Noureddine Naybet – Sporting CP – 1994–1996
Abdkrim Nazir – União de Leiria – 1996–1997
Hamid Rhanem – Desportivo das Aves – 2002–2003, Naval – 2004–2005
Abdelilah Saber – Sporting CP – 1996–2000
Mohammed Sbae – Campomaiorense – 1997–1998
Tarik Sektioui – Marítimo – 1999, Porto – 2006–2009
Jaouad Zairi – Boavista – (2006)–2007

Mozambique
Armando Sá – Belenenses – 1992–1994, Rio Ave – 1988–2001, Braga – 2001, Benfica – 2002–2004
Ricardo Campos (footballer, born 1985) – União Madeira – 2015–2016
Chiquinho Conde – Belenenses – 1987–1991, 1995–1996, Braga – 1991–1992, Vitória de Setúbal – 1992–1994,(1996)–1997, 1997–2000, Alverca – 2000–2001
Dário – Académica – 1996–2004, 2004–2005, Vitória de Guimarães – 2005–2006, Estrela da Amadora – 2006–2007
Djão – Belenenses – 1979–1987, Penafiel – 1987–1990
Ali Hassan – Sporting CP – 1988–1992
Jojó – União de Leiria – 1992–1993, Penafiel – 1995–1997, Belenenses – 1997–1999
Reinildo Mandava – Belenenses SAD – 2018–2019
Mateus – Boavista – 1992–1995
Mexer – Sporting CP – 2010–2012, Olhanense – 2010–2012, Nacional – 2012–2014
Paíto – Sporting CP – 2003–2006, Vitória de Guimarães – 2005–(2006), Braga – 2006–(2007)
Tico-Tico – Estrela da Amadora – 1994–1996
Tininho – Beira-Mar, Belenenses – 2004–05, 2006–07, 2009
Witi – Nacional – 2015–2017, 2018–2019, 2020–

Netherlands
Ton Blanker – Vitória de Guimarães – 1980–1981
Remco Boere - Gil Vicente - 1991–1992
Khalid Boulahrouz – Sporting CP – 2012–2013
Fabian de Freitas – Boavista – 1997–(1998)
Jimmy Floyd Hasselbaink – Campomaiorense, Boavista – 1995–97
Glenn Helder – Benfica – 1996–1997
Peter Houtman – Sporting CP – 1986–1989
Ola John – Benfica – 2012–2015
Bruno Martins Indi – Porto – 2014–2016
Junas Naciri – União da Madeira – 2000–2002, Rio Ave – 2003–2005, Moreirense – 2006–2007
Floris Schaap – Portimonense – 1988–1991, Torreense – 1991–1993, Farense – 1993–1995, Braga – 1995–1996
Romano Sion – Vitória de Guimarães – 2000–2002
Jorg Smeets – Marítimo – 1999–2000
Arvid Smit – Marítimo – (2007)–2008, União de Leiria – 2007–(2008)
Gaston Taument – Benfica – (1997)–1998
Stan Valckx – Sporting CP – 1992–1995
Mitchell van der Gaag – Marítimo – 2001–2006
Antoine van der Linden – Marítimo – 2007–2009
Ronny van Es – Rio Ave – 2002–2004
Pierre van Hooijdonk – Benfica – 2000–2001
Clyde Wijnhard – Beira-Mar – 2003–2004
Nordin Wooter – Braga – 2003–2004
Romeo Wouden – Boavista – (1997)–1998
Ricky van Wolfswinkel – Sporting CP – 2011–2013
Stijn Schaars – Sporting CP – 2011–2013

Nigeria
Shehu Abdullahi – União Madeira – 2015–2016
Abiodun Agunbiade – Braga – 2000–2003, Naval – 2003–2004
Jacob Adebanjo – Vitória de Setúbal – (2017)–2018
Dele Alampasu – Feirense – 2015–
Amaobi – Rio Ave – 2004–(2005)
Emmanuel Amuneke – Sporting CP – 1994–1997
Kevin Amuneke – Vitória de Setúbal – 2006–2007, Nacional – 2009–2011
Azeez Balogun – Belenenses – 2009–2012
Chidi Onyemah – Rio Ave – 2005–2010
Haruna Doda – Belenenses – 1999–2000
Joseph Enakarhire – Sporting CP – 2004–2005
Ani Jeremiah – Estrela da Amadora – (2007)–2008
Sunny Ekeh Kingsley – Beira-Mar – 2003–2005
Henry Makinwa – Penafiel – 1997–1998, Vitória de Setúbal – 1998–2001, Gil Vicente – 2001–2002
Charles Obi – Boavista – 2007–(2008)
Uche Okafor – União de Leiria – (1994)–1995, Farense – 1995–1996
Samuel Okunowo – Benfica – 1999–2000
Oladapo Olufemi – Boavista – 2007–2008
Richard Daddy Owubokiri ("Ricky") – Benfica – 1988–(1989), Estrela da Amadora – 1989–1991, Boavista – 1991–1994, Belenenses – 1994–1995
Pascal – Nacional – 2001–2002, Vitória de Setúbal – 2002–2004,(2005)–2006, Penafiel – 2004–2005
Peter Rufai – Farense – 1994–1997, Gil Vicente – 1999–2000
Samson – Braga – 2000–2003
Samson Siasia – Tirsense – 1995–1996
Rashidi Yekini – Vitória de Setúbal – 1990–1994, 1996–(1997)

Northern Ireland
Colin Hill – Marítimo – 1986–1987

Norway
Noah Jean Holm – Vitória de Guimarães – 2020–,
Azar Karadas – Benfica – 2004–2005

Palestine
Javier Cohene – Paços de Ferreira, Vitória de Setúbal – 2010–2014
Oday Dabbagh – FC Arouca – 2021-
Daniel Mustafá – Estrela da Amadora, Belenenses – 2008-2009, 2010

Panama
José Luis Garcés – Belenenses – 2006–2007, Académica – 2008–2009
Gabriel Gómez – Belenenses – 2007–2008, 2008–2010

Paraguay
Diego Aguilera – Farense – (1999)–2000
Antolín Alcaraz – Beira-Mar – 2002–2007
Victor Aquino – Marítimo – 2008–(2009)
Jorge Brítez – Braga – 1999–2001, Moreirense – 2003–2004
Óscar Cardozo – Benfica – 2007–2014
Diego Figueredo – Boavista – 2005–2006
Carlos Gamarra – Benfica – 1997–1998
Juan Iturbe – Porto – 2011–2013
Lorenzo Melgarejo – Benfica – 2011–2013, Paços de Ferreira – 2011–2012
Luis Páez – Sporting CP – (2008)–2009
Carlos Paredes – Porto – 2000–2002, Sporting CP – 2006–2008
Iván Piris – Sporting CP – 2013–2014
Victor Quintana – Porto – 2001–2002, Moreirense – 2003–2004
César Ramírez – Sporting CP – 1996–1999
Fabio Ramos – Rio Ave – 1998–2001, Marítimo – 2001–2004
Ricardo Ismael Rojas – Benfica – 1999–2001
Miguel Velasquez Villalba – Fafe – 1987–1989

Peru
Ronald Baroni – Porto – 1994–1995, Felgueiras – 1995–1996
André Carrillo – Sporting CP – 2011–2016, Benfica – 2016–
Teófilo Cubillas – Porto – 1974–1976
Paolo Hurtado – Paços de Ferreira, Vitória de Guimarães – 2012–2015, 2016-
Germán Leguía – Farense – 1987–(1988)
Abel Augusto Lobatón – Marítimo – 2004–(2005)
Alberto Rodríguez – Braga – 2007–2011, Sporting CP – 2011–2012, Rio Ave – 2012–2013
Juan Seminario – Sporting CP – 1959–1961
Pablo Zegarra – Farense - 2000–2001

Poland
Dariusz Adamczuk – Belenenses – 1994–1995
Marcin Chmiest – Braga – 2006–2007
Rafał Grzelak – Boavista – 2006–2008
Andrzej Juskowiak – Sporting CP – 1992–1995
Krzysztof Kazimierczak – Boavista – 2006–(2007)
Przemysław Kaźmierczak – Boavista – 2006–2007, Porto – 2007–2010, Vitória de Setúbal – 2009–2010
Paweł Kieszek – Braga – 2007–2010, Vitória de Setúbal – 2009, Porto – 2010–2012, Vitória de Setúbal – 2012–2014, Estoril – 2014–2016, Rio Ave 2019–
Antoni Łukasiewicz – União de Leiria – 2007–2008
Łukasz Madej – Académica – 2008–2009
Grzegorz Mielcarski – Porto – 1995–1999
Józef Młynarczyk – Porto – 1985–1989
Marek Saganowski – Vitória de Guimarães – 2005–2006
Bartosz Ślusarski – União de Leiria – 2006–2007
Andrzej Woźniak – Porto – 1996–1997, Braga – 1997–1998

Qatar
Hussein Yasser – Braga – (2007)–2008, Boavista – 2007–(2008)

Romania
Florin Bătrânu – União de Leiria – (1999)–2000
Ovidiu Cuc – Chaves – 1996–1999, Gil Vicente – 1999–2000
Iosif Fabian – Sporting CP  – 1953–1955, Barreirense – 1955–1957, Caldas – (1958)–1959
Lucian Marinescu – Farense – 1999–2000, Académica – 2002–2004
Sebastian Mladen – Olhanense – 2013–2014
Marius Niculae – Sporting CP – 2001–2005
Basarab Panduru – Benfica – (1995)–1996, 1996–1998, Porto – (1998)–1999, Salgueiros – (1999)–2000
Raul Rusescu – Braga – 2013–2014
Marcel Sabou – Chaves – 1996–1998
Cristian Săpunaru – Porto – 2008–2012
Ion Sburlea – Marítimo – 1999–(2000)
László Sepsi– Benfica 2007–(2008)
Marius Şumudică – Marítimo – 1999–2001
Ion Timofte – Porto – 1991–1994, Boavista – 1994–2000

Russia
Aleksandr Kuzmichyov
Aleksandr Yeshchenko
Dmitri Alenichev – Porto – 2000–2004
Ilshat Faizulin – Alverca – 1998–1999, Farense – (1999)–2000
Andrei Ivanov – Alverca – 1998–1999
Marat Izmailov – Sporting CP – 2007–2013
Andrei Karyaka – Benfica – 2005–2007
Vasili Kulkov – Benfica – 1991–1994, Porto – 1994–1995, Alverca – 1999–2000
Stanislav Kritsyuk – Braga 2013–2016, Rio Ave 2013–(2014), Belenenses SAD 2020–
Alexander Mostovoi – Benfica – 1992–1993
Sergei Ovchinnikov – Benfica – 1998–1999, Alverca – 1999–2000, Porto – 2000–2002
Dmitri Prokopenko – Braga – 1997–1999, Santa Clara – 1999–2000, Varzim – 2000–2002
Sergei Yuran – Benfica – 1991–1994, Porto – 1994–1995
Ivan Zlobin – Famalicão – 2020–

Saint Lucia
Earl Jean – Felgueiras – 1995–1996

São Tomé and Príncipe
Jairson – Vitória de Guimarães – 1999–2000
Luís Leal – União de Leiria, Estoril, Belenenses – 2011–2012, 2012–2013, 2015
Marcos Barbeiro – Marítimo – 2015
Orlando – Estrela da Amadora – 1995–1997

Saudi Arabia
Saleh Al-Shehri – Beira-Mar – 2012–2013

Scotland
Ryan Gauld – Sporting CP – 2014–2019, Vitória de Setúbal – 2016-2017, C.D. Aves – 2017-2018, Farense – 2020–present
Steve Kean – Académica – 1988–1991
Stephen McPhee – Beira-Mar – 2004–2005
Billy Rafferty – Farense – 1985–1988
Ian Wallace – Marítimo – 1986–1987

Senegal
Abdoulaye Ba – Porto – 2010– , Covilhã – 2010–2011, Académica – 2011–2012, Vitória de Guimarães – 2013–2014
Mame Birame – Estrela da Amadora – 1993–1996
Mallo Diallo – Penafiel – 2005–2007
Lamine Diarra – Beira-Mar – 2006–(2007)
Baba Diawara – Marítimo – 2008, 2015–
El Hadji Diouf II – Vitória de Setúbal – (2009)–2010
Fary Faye – Beira-Mar – 1998–2003, 2008–, Boavista – 2003–2008
Marcel Gomis – Olhanense – 2007–2008, 2009–2011
Abdou Guirassy – Nacional – 2009–2010
Ladji Keita – Rio Ave – 2005–2008, Vitória de Setúbal – 2009–2010
Khadim – Boavista – 2000–2007
Lama – Vitória de Guimarães – 1997–1998
Maurice Mendy – Moreirense – 2004–2007
Deme N'Diaye – Estrela da Amadora – 2005–2009
Madior N'Diaye – Vitória de Setúbal – 2005–2007
Mamadou N'Diaye – Vitória de Setúbal – 2006–2007
Ousmane N'Diaye – Beira-Mar – 1994–(1995)
Dame N'Doye – Académica – 2006–2007
Ousmane N'Doye – Estoril – (2004)–2005, Penafiel – 2004–2006, Académica Coimbra – 2005–2008
Oumar Sané – Belenenses – 2003–2004
Adama François Sene – Vitória de Setúbal – 2009–2011, 2013–2015
Modou Sougou – União de Leiria – 2004–2005, 2006–2008, Vitória de Guimarães – 2005–2006, Académica – 2008–2011
Mickaël Tavares – Alverca – 2000–2002

Serbia
Darko Anić – Nacional – (2005)–2006, Rio Ave – 2005–(2006)
Srđan Bajčetić – Braga – 1997–1998
Jovo Bosančić – União da Madeira – 1992–1996, 1999–2000, Campomaiorense – 1995–(1996), Nacional – 2000–2003
Miloš Bosančić – Boavista – (2007)–2008
Miroslav Ćurčić – Farense – 1990–1991, Belenenses – 1991–1993, Estoril – 1993–1996
Vukašin Dević – Beira-Mar – 2006–2007, Belenenses – 2007–2008, 2009–2011
Nenad Divac – Rio Ave – 1996–1999
Ljubinko Drulović – Gil Vicente – 1992–1993, Porto – 1994–2001, Benfica – 2001–2003, Penafiel – 2004–2005
Ivan Dudić – Benfica – 2000–2002
Ivan Đurđević – Farense – 2000–2002, Vitória de Guimarães – 2002–2005, Belenenses – 2005–2007
Milan Đurđević – Leça – (1995)–1996
Anđelko Đuričić – União de Leiria – 2009–2011
Filip Đuričić – Benfica – 2013–
Božidar Đurković – Vitória de Guimarães – 1998–1999
Ljubomir Fejsa – Benfica – 2013–
Milan Gajić – Boavista – (2007)–2008
Dragan Groćeša – União da Madeira – 1990–1998
Zoran Hajdić – Salgueiros – 1994–1998
Željko Janović – Gil Vicente – 1995–1996
Predrag Jokanović – União da Madeira – 1993–1995, Marítimo – 1995–2001, Nacional – 2001–2003
Milić Jovanović – Nacional – 1994–1996, Leça – 1996–2000
Stevan Kovačević – Naval – 2008–2010
Aleksandar Krstić – Beira-Mar – 1992–1994, Felgueiras – 1994–1996
Dragoslav Lepinjica – União da Madeira – 1990–1996
Ivan Litera – Salgueiros – 2000–2002, Estrela da Amadora – 2003–2004
Nenad Markičević – União da Madeira – 1994–1998
Lazar Marković – Benfica – 2013–2014
Nemanja Matić – Benfica – 2011–2014
Zoran Mijanović – Farense – 1998–2002
Nikola Milojević – Vitória de Setúbal – 2006–2009
Stevan Milovac – Salgueiros – 1989–1997
Branko Milovanović – Vitória de Guimarães – 1997–1999
Miljan Mrdaković – Vitória de Guimarães – 2007–2008
Jovica Nikolić – Salgueiros – 1989–1993
Srđan Obradović – Braga – 1995–1996
Miloš Pavlović – Académica – 2006–2009
Dragan Punišić – Beira-Mar – 1993–1995, Farense – 1995–1998
Siniša Radanović – Vitória de Guimarães – 2007–2008
Sreto Ristić – Campomaiorense – 1999–(2000)
Jovo Simanić – Boavista – 1994–1995
Saša Šimić – União da Madeira – 1994–1996, 1999–2002, Boavista – 1996–1998, Beira-Mar – 1998–1999
Milan Stepanov – Porto – 2007–2009
Goran Stevanović – Farense – 1993–1994, Vitória de Setúbal – 1994–1995, Campomaiorense – 1995–1996
Vladimir Stojković – Sporting CP – 2007–2011
Vladan Stojković – Leça – 1994–2000
Vlada Stošić – Vitória de Setúbal – 1997–1999
Miralem Sulejmani – Benfica – 2013–2015
Ivan Todorović – Nacional – 2010–2012
Borko Veselinović – Beira-Mar – 2006–(2007)
Zoran Vukčević – Chaves – (1994)–1995, 1996–1997
Goran Živanović – União da Madeira – 1991–1996

Sierra Leone
Lamin Conteh – Boavista – (1997)–1998, Varzim – 1997–(1998)
Gbassay Sessay – Estrela da Amadora – 1987–1989, Vitória de Setúbal – 1992–1994, 1995–1996

Slovakia
Vojtech Andrášik – Porto – 1940–1943
Marek Čech – Porto – 2005–2008
Martin Chrien – Benfica – 2017–2020
Marián Had – Sporting CP – 2007–2008
Milan Lalkovič – Vitória de Guimarães – 2012–2013
Tomáš Oravec – Boavista – 2005–(2006)
Boris Peškovič – Académica – 2008–2009
Jakub Vojtuš – Olhanense – 2013–2014
Marián Zeman – Beira-Mar – 2003–2005

Slovenia
Vid Belec – Olhanense – 2013–2014
Ažbe Jug – Sporting CP – 2015–
Andrej Komac – Marítimo – (2005)–2006
Miran Pavlin – Porto – 2000–2002
Nejc Pečnik – Nacional – 2009–2012
Damir Pekič – Marítimo – 2005–2006
Ermin Rakovič – Nacional – 1997–1998, Beira-Mar – 1998–1999
Zlatko Zahovič – Vitória de Guimarães – 1993–1996, Porto – 1996–1999, Benfica – 2001–2005
Jan Oblak – Benfica – 2010–2014, Beira-Mar – 2010, Olhanense – 2011, União de Leiria – 2011–2012, Rio Ave – 2012–2013

South Africa
David Byrne - Estoril, Belenenses - 1983–1985
Lyle Foster – Vitória de Guimarães – 2020–
Calvin Kadi – Portimonense – 2010-11
Kobamelo Kodisang – SC Braga – 2022–
Jan Lechaba - Beira-Mar - 1979–1980
Benni McCarthy – Porto – 2002, 2003–2006
Thibang Phete – Vitória de Guimarães – 2015–2016, F.C. Famalicão – 2019–2020, Belenenses SAD – 2019–
Luther Singh – Chaves – 2019, Moreirense – 2019-20, Paços de Ferreira – 2020-21
Sphephelo Sithole – Belenenses SAD – 2019–
Eric Tinkler – Vitória de Setúbal – 1992–1996
Bongani Zungu – Vitória de Guimarães – 2016-17
Mandla Zwane – Penafiel – 1994–1995, Gil Vicente – 1995–1996

Spain
Aarón – Braga – 2015–
Adrián – Porto – 2014–
Carlos Pérez Álvarez – Chaves – 1998–1999, Vitória de Guimarães – 1999–2001, Nacional – 2001–2004
Miguel Ángel Angulo – Sporting CP (2009)–2010
Mikel Antiá – Braga – 2002–2003
Ibón Pérez Arrieta – Braga – 2002–2003, Estoril – 2004–2005
Iñigo Arteaga – Chaves – 1998–2000
Cesar Atienza – Boavista – (1999)–2000
José Belman – Nacional – 2001–2008
Alberto Bodelón – Estrela da Amadora – 1996–1998
Bráulio – Farense – 1996–1998
Alberto Bueno – Porto – 2015–
José Campaña – Porto – 2014–2015
Joan Capdevila – Benfica – 2011–2012
Diego Capel – Sporting CP – 2011–2015
Iker Casillas – Porto – 2015–
Catanha – Belenenses – 1995–1996, 2004–2005
Chano – Benfica – 1999–2001
Dani – Naval – 2002–2004, 2007–2008, Académica – 2004–2006
José Luis Deus – Braga – 2000–2001
Dani Díaz – Chaves – 1995–1998, Marítimo – 1998–2001
Andrés Fernández – Porto – 2014–
Paco Fortes – Farense – 1984–1991
Fran – Leça – 1996–2000
Francisco Gallardo – Vitória de Guimarães – 2005–(2006)
José Luís Gallardo – Campomaiorense – 1997–1998
Raúl Iglesias – Farense – 1998–2001
Javi García – Benfica – 2009–2012, fBoavista – 2020–
Álex Grimaldo – Benfica – 2016–
José Ángel – Porto – 2014–
Juan Carlos – Braga – 2011–
Koke – Sporting CP – 2005–(2006)
Rufino Lekue – Moreirense – 2002–2003
Loinaz – Leça – 1997–1999
Iván Marcano – Porto – 2014–
Carlos Marchena – Benfica – 2000–2001
Marcelino – União de Leiria – 1999–2000
Matute – Chaves – 1996–1998
Míner – Chaves – 1995–1998, Alverca – 1999–2000, Santa Clara – 2000–2004
Moisés – Santa Clara – 2002–2003
Mora – Belenenses – 2001–2002
Miguel Mora – União da Madeira – 2001–2003, Rio Ave – 2003–2010
José Luis Morales – Santa Clara – 2001–2002
Nolito – Benfica – 2011–2013
Óliver – Porto – 2014–2015
Ivan Peñaranda – Santa Clara – 2002–2003
Pepin – Marítimo – 2002–2003
Juan Antonio Pizzi – Porto – (2000)–2001
José Puntas – União da Madeira – 2001–2002, Paços de Ferreira – 2002–2004
Raúl – Chaves – 1996–1998
José Antonio Reyes – Benfica – 2008–2009
António Segura Robaina – Sporting CP – 1999–2000
Roberto – Benfica – 2010–2011
Rodri – Farense – 2000–2002, Gil Vicente – 2002–2003
Rodrigo – Benfica – 2010–2015
Oriol Rosell – Sporting CP – 2014–
Jesús Seba – Chaves – 1998–1999, Belenenses – 1999–2002
Cristian Tello – Porto – 2014–2016
Toñito – Vitória de Setúbal – 1997–1999, Sporting CP – 1999–2001, 2002–2004, Santa Clara – 2001–2002, Boavista – 2004–2005, União de Leiria – 2007–2008
Toñito – Chaves – 1994–1996, 1997–2000, Vitória de Guimarães – 1996–1997
Víctor Torres Mestre – Varzim – 2001–2002
Tote – Benfica – 1999–2000
Viqueira – Campomaiorense – 1997–1998
Waldo – Campomaiorense – 1998–2000
Yonathan – Estrela da Amadora – 2006–2008
Alberto Zapater – Sporting CP – 2010–2011
Pablo Moreno – CS Marítimo –2022-
Pedro Porro – Sporting CP – 2020
Adán – Sporting CP – 2020

Suriname
Darl Douglas – Marítimo – 2006–2007

Sweden
Ulf Ottosson - Chaves
Nicklas Bärkroth - União de Leiria
Anders Andersson – Benfica – 2001–2004, Belenenses – 2004–2005
Erik Torsten Andersson – Estrela da Amadora – 1996–1997
Michael Brundin – Vitória de Setúbal – 1994–1995, Campomaiorense – 1995–1996
Lars Eriksson – Porto – 1995–1998
Hans Eskilsson – Sporting CP – 1988–1989, Braga – 1989–1991, Estoril – 1991–1992
Pontus Farnerud – Sporting CP – 2006–2008
Tobias Grahn – Beira-Mar – 1998–1999
Martin Holmberg – Boavista – 1987–1990
Victor Lindelöf – Benfica – 2013–
Mats Magnusson – Benfica – 1987–1992
Alexander Östlund Vitória de Guimarães – 1998–1999
Martin Pringle – Benfica – 1996–1999
Jonny Rödlund – Braga – 1995–1997
Jonas Thern – Benfica – 1989–1992
Stefan Schwarz – Benfica – 1991–1994
Fredrik Söderström – Vitória de Guimarães – 1997–2001, Porto – 2001–2004, Braga – 2003–2004, Estrela da Amadora – 2004–2005
Glenn Strömberg – Benfica – 1983–1984

Switzerland
Diego Benaglio – Nacional – 2005–2008
Loris Benito – Benfica – 2014–2015
Gélson Fernandes – Sporting CP – 2012–2013
Alessandro Mangiarratti – Belenenses – 2003–2005

Tanzania
Raul Neves Chipenda – Belenenses – 1995–1996, Vitória de Setúbal – 1996–2003

Timor-Leste

Alfaia – Leça – 1995–1998
Joca – Braga, Riopele – 1969, 1976, 1977–1978
Pelézinho – Académico de Viseu – 1978–1979
Pincho – Belenenses – 1973–1977
Rogério – Olhanense – 1963–1964

Trinidad and Tobago
Russell Latapy – Académica – 1990–1994, Porto – 2004–2006, Boavista – 1996–1998
Leonson Lewis – Académica – 1990–1994, Felgueiras – 1995–1996, Boavista – 1996–1997, Chaves – 1997–1998, Estrela da Amadora – 1998–2000
Clint Marcelle – Vitória de Setúbal – 1992–1993, Felgueiras – 1994–1996
Aurtis Whitley – Vitória de Setúbal – 1997–1998

Tunisia
Larry Azouni – Nacional – 2020–
Selim Benachour – Vitória de Guimarães – 2005–2006

Turkey
Sinan Bolat – Porto – 2013–
Fatih Sonkaya – Porto – 2005–2006, Académica – 2006–2007

Ukraine
Serhiy Atelkin – Boavista – 1998–1999
Serhiy Kandaurov – Benfica – 1997–2001, Salgueiros – 2003–2004
Serhiy Scherbakov – Sporting CP – 1992–1994 (*USSR/Ukr INT)

United States
Freddy Adu – Benfica, Belenenses – 2007-2008, 2009-2010
Alejandro Alvarado Jr. – Vizela – 2021–
Tyler Boyd – Vitória de Guimarães – 2015–2019, Tondela – 2017–2018
Reggie Cannon – Boavista – 2020–
Kenny Cooper – Académica – 2004–2005
Jovan Kirovski – Sporting CP – 2000–2001
Alex Mendez – Vizela – 2021–
Oguchi Onyewu – Sporting CP – 2011–2013
Keaton Parks – Benfica – 2017–2018
Caleb Patterson-Sewell – Vitória de Setúbal, Gil Vicente – 2012–2013, 2014–2015

Uruguay
Carlos Aguiar – Académica – 2008–2009
Luis Aguiar – Estrela da Amadora – (2007)–2008, Académica – 2007–(2008), Braga – 2008–2009
Carlos Bueno – Sporting CP – 2006–2007
Gonzalo Bueno – União Madeira – (2015)–2016
Sebastián Coates – Sporting CP – 2016– 
Alejandro Díaz – Porto – 1996–1999
Álvaro Fernández – Nacional – 2009–2010, Vitória de Setúbal – 2009
Jorge Fucile – Porto – 2006–2014
Mauro Goicoechea – Arouca – 2014–2015
Marcelo Lipatin – Marítimo – 2006–2007, Nacional – 2007–2008, Trofense – 2008–2009
Rodrigo Mora – Benfica – 2011–2013
Horacio Peralta – Académica – (2007)–2008
Álvaro Pereira – Porto – 2009–2012
Maxi Pereira – Benfica – 2007–2015, Porto – 2015–
Richard Porta – Belenenses – 2008–2009
Cristian Rodríguez – Benfica – 2007–2008, Porto – 2008–2012
Jonathan Rodríguez – Benfica – 2015–2016
Rodolfo Rodríguez – Sporting CP – 1988–1989
"Tanque" Silva – Beira-Mar – 2004–2005
Edgardo Simovic – Marítimo – 1995–1997
Jonathan Urretavizcaya – Benfica – 2008–2014 
Marco Vanzini – Braga – 2003–2004
Franco Israel – Sporting CP – 2022 -

Uzbekistan
Sardor Rashidov – C.D. Nacional – 2018–(2019)

Venezuela
Breitner (footballer, born 1989) – União Madeira – 2015–2016
Jhonder Cádiz – Vitória de Setúbal - 2018–2019, União da Madeira – 2015–2016, Nacional – 2016–2017, Moreirense – (2017)–2018, Vitória de Setúbal – 2018–2019, Benfica – 2019–
Alejandro Cichero – Benfica – 1997–1998
Fernando de Ornelas – Marítimo – 2002
Jeriel De Santis – Boavista – 2020–
Edder Farías – União Madeira – 2015–2016
Jeffrén – Sporting CP – 2011–2014
Pedro Lavoura – Académica de Coimbra, Braga – 1997–1999, 1999–2000
Jhon Murillo – Benfica 2015– , Tondela – 2015–
Ángelo Peña – Braga, Portimonense – 2010, 2010
Edder Pérez – Marítimo – 2007–08
José Antonio Pestana – Marítimo – 2001
Mario Rondón – Paços de Ferreira 2009–2011, Nacional – 2011–15

Vietnam
Lê Công Vinh – Leixões – (2009)–2010

Wales
Andy Marriott – Beira-Mar – 2003–2004
Mark Pembridge – Benfica – 1998–1999
Dean Saunders – Benfica – 1998–1999

Zambia
Rainford Kalaba – Braga – 2008–2010, Gil Vicente – 2008–2009, União de Leiria – 2009
Collins Mbesuma – Marítimo – 2006–2007
Perry Mutapa – Farense – 1998–2000

Notes

References

External links
 Primeira Liga squads at zerozero

 
Portugal
 
Association football player non-biographical articles